Bagshot Park is a royal residence located near Bagshot, a village  south of Windsor. It is on Bagshot Heath, a  tract of formerly open land in Surrey and Berkshire.  Bagshot Park occupies  within the designated area of Windsor Great Park.

The Mansion house was listed, Grade II, as a building of special architectural or historic interest in 1976. The present building was built on the site of an earlier mansion in 1879 with red brick and stone dressings in Tudor gothic style, for Prince Arthur, Duke of Connaught. Side and rear extensions were added in the late 19th and early 20th centuries. The landscaped grounds are also Grade II listed on the Register of Historic Parks and Gardens.

History
Prince Henry came to Bagshot Lodge on 4 September 1609 and gave £1 to the musicians who entertained him. The Lodge was rebuilt between 1631 and 1633 as one of a series of small lodges designed for Charles I by Inigo Jones. It was remodelled between 1766 and 1772 according to designs of James Paine for George Keppel, the 3rd Earl of Albemarle, and altered in 1798 by Sir John Soane for the Duke of Clarence (later King William IV), who lived there until 1816.

Bagshot Park was subsequently used by Prince William Frederick, Duke of Gloucester, nephew of King George III. The Duke added pieces of property between the estate and Sunningdale; his widow, Princess Mary, daughter of King George III, continued to live there after his death until she moved out in 1847. The original house was demolished in 1877–78.

A new building with 120 rooms was completed in 1879. The 1881 census records an equerry and 26 servants living in the main house: an under butler, a housekeeper, four valets, two lady's maids, two dressers, a cook, three kitchen maids, three housemaids, three footmen, a page, a porter, a scullery maid, two other junior posts and a soldier. A coachman and seven grooms lived in the stables. Two other domestic staff lived in one of the lodges, three agricultural workers lived in another, and one gardener is recorded as living on the estate. From 1880 this was the principal residence of Prince Arthur, Duke of Connaught and Strathearn, a son of Queen Victoria. The Duke, who was Governor General of Canada from 1911 until 1916, died at Bagshot Park in 1942. The property had been in grace and favour occupation.

Following the Duke's death, Bagshot Park was requisitioned by the Army for the Auxiliary Territorial Service (later to become the WRAC) to use as their Staff College. This closed at the end of the war.

In 1946 George VI offered the house to the Royal Army Chaplains' Department to be used as a Church House and Chaplains' Depot. The Army Chaplains were in residence from 1947 but relocated to Andover, Hampshire, in April 1996, shortly before the then Earl and Countess of Wessex took over the tenancy. The Army Chaplains famously placed a notice by the pond reading "Please do not walk on the water". The original sign was removed when the chaplains left, but a new one, made by J. M. J. Holland Chairmakers and given to the Earl of Wessex, has replaced it.

Although the house was criticised as ugly by the architectural historian Nikolaus Pevsner, it was said to be the most adventurous royal house to be created since the death of Albert, the Prince Consort of Queen Victoria, in 1861. It is also a remarkable monument in the history of Indian taste in Britain: an Indian billiard room wing, which inspired the more famous Durbar Room at Osborne House, was prefabricated in India and installed in the 1880s. This was a result of the Duke of Connaught's Indian tour, when the Duke met John Lockwood Kipling and asked him to design and oversee the installation of a billiard room in Indian taste. The Indian craftsmen who assembled and installed the room at Bagshot were housed in a tent in the grounds. The work took two years and was a wedding gift from Indian princes to the Duke and Duchess of Connaught.

Lease to Prince Edward, Duke of Edinburgh 

In March 1998, the Mansion House at Bagshot Park, including a block of stables and Sunningdale Lodge, was leased by the Crown Estate to Prince Edward for 50 years. The Mansion House was renovated as a residence for the prince. The renovation was partly funded by the Crown Estate and partly funded by Prince Edward. The renovation was originally estimated to cost £2.18m, with £1.6m from the Crown Estate and the remainder being paid by the prince. The National Audit Office (NAO) report on the transaction states that the final cost of renovations was £2.98m; the Crown Estate paid £1.6m and the estimated excess of £1.38m was paid by Prince Edward. 
The prince rented it from the Crown Estate initially for £5,000 a year then after renovation rising to £90,000 a year subject to 15-year rent reviews linked to RPI. According to the NAO report, the property leased by the prince does not include commercial farmland or woodland. The lease agreement permits subletting of the stable block.

Prince Edward has since extended the lease to 150 years for £5m.

Notes

References
Colvin, Howard. (1995). A Biographical Dictionary of British Architects 1600-1840. 3rd ed. Yale University Press.

External links

bagshotvillage.org.uk page

1879 establishments in England
Country houses in Surrey
Royal residences in England
Royal residences in the United Kingdom
Jacobethan architecture
Houses completed in 1879
Grade II listed houses
Grade II listed buildings in Surrey
Grade II listed parks and gardens in Surrey